Martyn Taylor Lucking (born 24 March 1938 in Leigh-on-Sea) is a British former shot putter.

Athletics career
Lucking competed in the 1960 Summer Olympics and in the 1964 Summer Olympics.

He topped the podium for England at the 1962 British Empire and Commonwealth Games, improving on his runner-up finish to Arthur Rowe when he represented England at the 1958 Games. He also represented Great Britain twice at the European Athletics Championships, competed in the same years as his Commonwealth appearances.

He also represented England in the shot put, at the 1970 British Commonwealth Games in Edinburgh, Scotland.

References

1938 births
Living people
British male shot putters
English male shot putters
Olympic athletes of Great Britain
Athletes (track and field) at the 1960 Summer Olympics
Athletes (track and field) at the 1964 Summer Olympics
People from Leigh-on-Sea
Commonwealth Games medallists in athletics
Athletes (track and field) at the 1958 British Empire and Commonwealth Games
Athletes (track and field) at the 1962 British Empire and Commonwealth Games
Athletes (track and field) at the 1970 British Commonwealth Games
Commonwealth Games gold medallists for England
Commonwealth Games silver medallists for England
Medallists at the 1958 British Empire and Commonwealth Games
Medallists at the 1962 British Empire and Commonwealth Games